Joanna Brooks (born September 29, 1971) is an American author and professor of English and comparative literature at San Diego State University. Brooks is currently the associate vice president of faculty advancement and professor of English and comparative literature. She is a frequent media commentator on faith in American life, particularly in relation to her own Mormonism.  Politico named her one of 2011's "50 politicos to watch" for her Twitter feed, @askmormongirl.

Mormonism
Brooks writes extensively about Mormonism and Mormon feminism and is often quoted in the media related to issues regarding the Church of Jesus Christ of Latter-day Saints. The Huffington Post writes, "Brooks specializes in explaining the Church of Jesus Christ of Latter-day Saints to non-Mormons, and in presenting a different way to be Mormon to those steeped in its orthodoxy." She wrote a question-and-answer blog from 2010 to 2014 called "Ask Mormon Girl" with the tagline "unorthodox answers from an imperfect source". She also wrote as a senior correspondent for Religion Dispatches from 2011 to 2014, frequently addressing Mormon issues. In early 2012, she self-published a memoir called The Book of Mormon Girl: Stories from an American Faith, which was later picked up by Simon & Schuster and published by them in August 2012. Brooks was noted as one of "13 Religious Women to Watch in 2012".

Brooks sits on the board of directors for Dialogue: A Journal of Mormon Thought. Brooks is described as a feminist and liberal Mormon, in contrast to the predominantly conservative culture of Mormonism. In 2017 Brooks was among and ten co-authors publishing "Shoulder to the Wheel: Resources to Help Latter-day Saints Face Racism"

Personal life
Brooks is married to David Kamper and has two daughters. She holds a bacherlor's degree from Brigham Young University and a PhD from UCLA. She is a member of the Church of Jesus Christ of Latter-day Saints.

Works
 "Face Zion Forward": First Writers of the Black Atlantic, 1785–1798 (Editor, with John Saillant). Northeastern, 2002. 
 American Lazarus: Religion and the Rise of African-American and Native American Literatures (Author). Oxford, 2003. . Winner of the Modern Language Association William Sanders Scarborough Award.
 The Collected Writings of Samson Occom, Mohegan: Literature and Leadership in Eighteenth-Century America (Editor). Oxford, 2006. 
 Transatlantic Feminisms in the Age of Revolutions (Editor, with Lisa L. Moore and Caroline Wigginton). Oxford, 2012. 
 The Book of Mormon Girl: Stories from an American Faith (Author). Free Press, 2012. . Winner of the Association for Mormon Letters memoir award.
 Why We Left: Untold Stories and Songs of America's First Immigrants (Author). Minnesota, 2013. 
 Mormon Feminism: Essential Writings (Co-Editor). Oxford, 2015. 
Saving Alex: When I Was Fifteen I Told My Mormon Parents I Was Gay, and That's When My Nightmare Began. (By Alex Cooper, with Brooks). HarperOne, 2016.

References

External links
Official website
Ask Mormon Girl blog
San Diego State University faculty profile
Articles at Religion Dispatches
Profile at Mormon Scholars Testify
Joanna Brooks papers at the University of Utah library

1971 births
American Latter Day Saint writers
Brigham Young University alumni
Living people
Mormon feminists
Mormon memoirists
San Diego State University faculty
Latter Day Saints from California
American women non-fiction writers